Interchange may refer to:

Transport 
 Interchange (road), a collection of ramps, exits, and entrances between two or more highways
 Interchange (freight rail), the transfer of freight cars between railroad companies
 Interchange station, a railway station where two or more routes meet and allow passengers to change trains
 Cross-platform interchange, the transfer between trains across a station platform
 Transport interchange or transport hub to include jointly operated interchange flights by two or more airlines

Other uses 
 Interchange (de Kooning), a 1955 painting by Willem de Kooning
 Interchange (album), a 1994 album by guitarist Pat Martino
 Interchange (Australian rules football), a team position in Australian rules football
 Interchange circuit, a circuit that facilitates the exchange of data and signaling information
 Interchange fee, a fee paid between banks in the payment card industry
 Interchange (film), a 2016 Malaysian fantasy thriller film
 Interchange of limiting operations, the commutativity of certain mathematical operations
 Interchange, a series of ESL educational books
 Interchange, an alternative name for Substitution (sport)

See also
 Interchangeability (disambiguation)
 Great American Interchange
 Exchange (disambiguation)